Triplophysa tenuicauda is a species of stone loach in the genus Triplophysa, found in China, India and Pakistan.

References

tenuicauda
Fish described in 1866
Taxa named by Franz Steindachner